Bukowiec is a village in the administrative district of Gmina Kolbuszowa, in south-eastern Poland. It lies approximately 5 km south of Kolbuszowa and 23 km north-west of the regional capital Rzeszów.

References

Bukowiec